Lerner is a Jewish and German family name. Its literal meaning can be either "student" or "scholar". It may refer to:

Organizations 

 Lerner Enterprises, a real estate company
 Lerner Newspapers
 Lerner Publishing Group, a publisher of children's literature
 Lerner New York, the former name of the New York & Company clothing chain

People 
 Aaron Bunsen Lerner  (1920–2007), American physician, researcher and professor
 Abba Lerner, American economist
 Adam Lerner, American museum curator
 Al Lerner, billionaire, chairman of MBNA
 Al Lerner (composer), American musician, pianist, and big band leader
 Alan Jay Lerner, American lyricist and librettist
 Alejandro Lerner, Argentine musician
 Avi Lerner, film producer
 Barron H. Lerner, American professor of medicine
 Ben Lerner, American poet
 Claire Lerner, non-profit director
 David Lerner (1951-1997?), American poet
 Edward (Ned) Lerner, computer-game maker
 Edward M. Lerner, science-fiction writer
 Eric Lerner, American scientist and popular science author
 Gad Lerner, Italian journalist and writer
 George Lerner, inventor of the toy Mr. Potato Head
 Gerda Lerner, a founder of the fields of women and African American history
 Irving Lerner, alleged Soviet spy in the US during World War II
 I. Michael Lerner, geneticist and evolutionary biologist
 Jacqueline Lerner, American psychologist
 Jaime Lerner, architect and urban planner, Brazilian state governor
 Jennifer Lerner, professor and experimental social psychologist
 Jimmy Lerner, American poet, novelist, and criminal
 Josh Lerner, American economist, professor at the Harvard Business School
 Ken Lerner, American actor
 Konstantin Lerner, Ukrainian chess grandmaster
 Laurence Lerner, literary critic, poet and novelist
 Leo Lerner, a newspaper publisher
 Lois Lerner
 Mark Lerner, American businessman
 Max Lerner, American journalist and educator
 Melvin J. Lerner, professor of social psychology
 Michael Lerner (disambiguation), multiple people
 Murray Lerner, American film director and producer
 Osip Mikhailovich Lerner, 19th century Russian Jewish intellectual and lawyer
 Randy Lerner, American entrepreneur and sports team owner
 Richard Lerner, American research chemist
 Rita G. Lerner (1929–1994), American physicist and science communicator
 Robert E. Lerner, American medieval historian
 Samuel Lerner, Romanian songwriter American theater and film
 Samuel A. Lerner, Co-founder Lerner Shops, father of Alan J. Lerner
 Sam Lerner, American child actor
 Sandra Lerner, co-founder of Cisco Systems
 Santiago Lerner Colombian cybersecurity engineer
 Sara Hestrin-Lerner, Israeli physiologist
 Sidney Lerner, Manitoba judge
 Stephen Lerner, labor and community organizer
 Ted Lerner (1925–2023), American real estate developer and billionaire, owner of the Washington Nationals
 Theodor Lerner, German journalist and polar explorer

Other uses 
 Lerner Index
 "Lerner Exchange," an illegal maneuver figuring in the conviction of ex-media baron Conrad Black

See also
 Lerner and Loewe, the musical partnership of lyricist Alan Jay Lerner and composer Frederick Loewe

German-language surnames
Jewish surnames
Occupational surnames
Yiddish-language surnames